Hanna Ihorivna Novosad (born 28 July 1990) is a Ukrainian educational activist, civil servant and politician. The Minister of Education and Science of Ukraine in the Honcharuk Government.

Biography 
In 2007, she graduated from the Ukrainian Humanities Lyceum at the Taras Shevchenko National University of Kyiv. In 2011, Novosad received a bachelor's degree in political science from the National University of Kyiv-Mohyla Academy. In 2013, she received a master's degree in European studies from Maastricht University (the Netherlands). Novosad is fluent in English and German.

She is a Fellow of the Open Society Fund.

During 2012–2013, Novosad had internships in think tanks in Spain and the Czech Republic. Member of the Canada-Ukraine Parliamentary Program.

From 2014 to 2019, she worked at the Ministry of Education and Science of Ukraine. From March to November 2014, Novosad served as an advisor to the Minister of Education and Science Serhiy Kvit. Until December 2017, she headed the Department of International Cooperation and European Integration of the Ministry of Education and Science.

From December 2017 to August 2019, she was the Head of the Directorate of Strategic Planning and European Integration of the Ministry of Education and Science.

Novosad was a member of the Servant of the People political party. She was elected to the Verkhovna Rada in 2019.

From August 26, 2019, until March 4, 2020, she was the Minister of Education and Science of Ukraine.

See also 
 List of members of the parliament of Ukraine, 2019–24

References

External links 

 
 Cabinet of Ministers (in Ukrainian)

1990 births
Living people
People from Ladyzhyn
National University of Kyiv-Mohyla Academy alumni
Maastricht University alumni
Education activists
Ukrainian civil servants
Education and science ministers of Ukraine
Women government ministers of Ukraine
Servant of the People (political party) politicians
Ninth convocation members of the Verkhovna Rada
21st-century Ukrainian women politicians
21st-century Ukrainian politicians
Women members of the Verkhovna Rada